Robert Arthur Taylor (17 October 1886 – 5 April 1934) was an English politician, Labour MP for Lincoln from 1924 to 1931.

Taylor was born in Metheringham in Lincolnshire, and became a tailor in Lincoln.  He also studied at Ruskin College.  He was a supporter of the Labour Party, and served on Lincoln City Council from 1914.  He stood unsuccessfully in Lincoln at the 1918 United Kingdom general election, and again in 1922 and 1923, before finally winning the seat in 1924.

Taylor lost his seat at the 1931 United Kingdom general election, and in 1933 became an organiser for the Shop Assistants' Union.  However, he was in poor health and died the following year.

Notes

Alumni of Ruskin College
Councillors in Lincolnshire
People from Lincolnshire
Labour Party (UK) MPs for English constituencies
UK MPs 1924–1929
UK MPs 1929–1931
1886 births
1934 deaths